Mums for Lungs is a nonprofit, grassroots environmental campaign group, based in the United Kingdom, which raises awareness of the health effects of air pollution, particularly on children.

History 

Mums for Lungs was formed in London in 2017 by a small group of parents, including human rights lawyer Jemima Hartshorn. They were inspired to take action partly by their personal experience of living in a traffic-polluted city and partly by the campaigning efforts of Rosamund Kissi-Debrah, a teacher-turned-activist whose daughter's death was attributed to the effects of breathing polluted air. The group quickly expanded from a few like-minded friends, first to multiple campaigns around London and then to multiple affiliated groups around the UK. It works closely with other environmental campaign groups, such as Choked Up and the Clean Cities Campaign, with the London Assembly, and with the Mayor of London.

In 2021, Mums for Lungs won the Sheila McKechnie Foundation Best Community Campaign Award for its work.

Campaigns 

Mums for Lungs campaigns on a range of air quality issues, including the expansion of London's Ultra Low Emission Zone; pollution from wood-burning stoves, fossil fuels, and diesel engines; the role of pollution in childhood asthma, clean air guidelines and targets, car-free streets, and cleaner travel to and from schools. Since 2018, it has helped to support a Mayor of London campaign called School Streets, which temporarily closes roads to traffic at school picking-up and dropping-off times to reduce the impact of pollution and improve safety. There are now an estimated 500 such schemes in London and 200 more outside the capital.

See also
 Air pollution in the United Kingdom
 Moms Clean Air Force

References

External links
 

Environmental organisations based in the United Kingdom
Environmental organizations established in 2017
Air pollution organizations
Air pollution in the United Kingdom